Froebel College is one of the four constituent colleges of the University of Roehampton.

History
The college was founded as a women's teacher training college in 1892 by followers of Friedrich Fröbel. The Froebel Society had been formed in 1874 and in 1892 Julia Salis Schwabe led an initiative to found a college for training teachers. It was imperative that the trainee teachers should be allowed to practice whilst they were learning so a school/kindergarten was established in parallel. The college became coeducational in 1965.

Emilie Michaelis (1834–1904) was the First Principal of Froebel College serving from 1892 until 1901. She was succeeded by Esther Lawrence (1862–1944) who led for over 30 years finshing in 1932. The third Principal was Eglantyne Mary Jebb MA (1889–1978) who led until 1955 when she was replaced by her friend Molly Brearley. 

Brearley created courses where teachers could gain diplomas and the college became involved in cross-curricula Batchelor of Edication courses. In their first year students would learn about child development while at the same time learning about subjects like maths and science. The college's ideas were contained in, Fundamentals in the First School, which was a book that Brearley and Raymond Bott editted and published in 1969. Brearley retired in 1970.

In 1975, the college became part of the Roehampton Institute of Higher Education, which became Roehampton University in 2004.

People associated with the college

Notable alumna
 Christie Ade Ajayi (born 1930), Nigerian specialist in early childhood education

Notable alumnae of the kindergarten
 Helena Rosa Wright (1887–1982) was a doctor and a pioneer in birth control
 Margaret Lowenfeld (1890–1973) was a pioneer in child psychology and psychotherapy

References

External links
 Froebel College, Roehampton University
 Roehampton University

University of Roehampton
Teacher training colleges in the United Kingdom
Former women's universities and colleges in the United Kingdom